The Pancho Villa Expedition—now known officially in the United States as the Mexican Expedition, but originally referred to as the "Punitive Expedition, U.S. Army"—was a military operation conducted by the United States Army against the paramilitary forces of Mexican revolutionary Francisco "Pancho" Villa from March 14, 1916, to February 7, 1917, during the Mexican Revolution of 1910–1920.

The expedition was launched in retaliation for Villa's attack on the town of Columbus, New Mexico, and was the most remembered event of the Mexican Border War. The declared objective of the expedition by the Wilson administration was the capture of Villa. Despite locating and defeating the main body of Villa's command who were responsible for the Columbus raid, U.S. forces were unable to achieve Wilson's stated main objective of preventing Villa's escape.

The active search for Villa ended after a month in the field when troops sent by Venustiano Carranza, the head of the Constitutionalist faction of the revolution and then head of the Mexican government, resisted the U.S. incursion. The Constitutionalist forces used arms at the town of Parral to resist passage of a U.S. Army column. The U.S. mission was changed to prevent further attacks on it by Mexican troops and to plan for the possibility of war. When war was averted diplomatically, the expedition remained in Mexico until February 1917 to encourage Carranza's government to pursue Villa and prevent further raids across the border.

Background

Trouble between the United States and Pancho Villa had been growing since October 1915, when the United States government officially recognized Villa's rival and former ally Venustiano Carranza as head of the government of Mexico. The U.S. also provided rail transportation through the United States, from Eagle Pass, Texas to Douglas, Arizona, for the movement of more than 5,000 Carrancista forces to fight Villa at the Battle of Agua Prieta; Villa's seasoned División del Norte was smashed. Feeling betrayed, Villa began attacking U.S. nationals and their property in northern Mexico. On November 26, 1915, Villa sent a force to attack the city of Nogales and in the course of the ensuing battle, engaged with American forces before withdrawing.

On January 11, 1916, sixteen American employees of the American Smelting and Refining Company were removed from a train near Santa Isabel, Chihuahua, and summarily stripped and executed. Brigadier General John J. Pershing, commanding the district headquartered at Fort Bliss, Texas, received information that Villa with a new force was on the border and about to make an attack that would force the United States to intervene, embarrassing the Carranza government. Raids were so commonplace, however, that the rumor was not seen as credible.

However, at about 4:00 am on March 9, 1916, Villa's troops attacked Columbus, New Mexico, and Camp Furlong, the U.S. Army post there, where four troops (about 240 soldiers) of the 13th Cavalry Regiment had been stationed since September 1912. Ten civilians and eight soldiers were killed in the attack, and two civilians and six soldiers wounded. The raiders burned the town, stole horses and mules, and seized machine guns, ammunition and merchandise, before fleeing back to Mexico.

However, Villa's soldiers had suffered considerable losses, with at least sixty-seven dead and dozens more wounded. Many of the casualties were inflicted when the machine gun troop of the 13th Cavalry led by 2nd Lt. John P. Lucas set up its Hotchkiss M1909 Benét–Mercié machine guns under fire along the north boundary of Camp Furlong, firing over 5,000 rounds apiece using the glow of burning buildings to illuminate targets. About thirteen of Villa's wounded later died of their wounds, and five wounded Villistas taken prisoner by the Americans were tried and hanged for murder. Local lore in Columbus holds that the attack may have been caused by a merchant in Columbus who supplied Villa with arms and ammunition. Villa is said to have paid several thousand dollars in cash for the weapons, but the merchant refused to deliver them unless he was paid in gold, giving "cause" for the raid.

The next day, acting on the recommendations of the commanders of his cavalry regiments, Southern Department commanding general Frederick Funston recommended an immediate pursuit in force into Mexico. U.S. President Woodrow Wilson concurred, designating Pershing to command the force and releasing a statement to the press:

An adequate force will be sent at once in pursuit of Villa with the single object of capturing him and putting a stop to his forays. This can and will be done in entirely friendly aid to the constituted authorities in Mexico and with scrupulous respect for the sovereignty of that Republic.

Expedition

Pursuit phase

Pershing assembled an expeditionary force consisting primarily of cavalry and horse artillery, the cavalry units armed with M1909 machine guns, M1903 Springfield rifles, and M1911 semi-automatic pistols.   On March 15, 1916,  organized into a provisional division of three brigades (four regiments of cavalry, two of infantry, and 6,600 men), the expedition crossed the border into Mexico to search for Villa, marching in two columns from Columbus and Culberson's Ranch.

The 2nd Provisional Cavalry Brigade reached Colonia Dublán after dark on March 17, where Pershing established the main base of operations for the campaign. The 1st Aero Squadron, included in the expedition for liaison duties and aerial reconnaissance on the orders of United States Secretary of War Newton D. Baker, departed San Antonio, Texas, on March 13 by rail with eight Curtiss JN3 airplanes and flew the first aerial reconnaissance of the area from Columbus on March 16, the day after it arrived. The entire squadron flew to the advanced camp at Colonia Dublán on March 19–20, losing two aircraft in the process.

Pershing immediately sent the 7th Cavalry (seven troops in two squadrons) south just after midnight on March 18 to begin the pursuit, followed by the 10th Cavalry moving by rail two days later. From March 20 to March 30, as the 11th Cavalry arrived in Columbus by train from Fort Oglethorpe, Georgia, and then forced marched into Mexico, Pershing dispatched four additional "flying columns" through the mountainous territory into the gaps between the original three columns. Persistent winter weather through early April, particularly bitterly cold nights at high altitude, made both pursuit and logistics more difficult. An additional regiment of cavalry and two of infantry were added to the expedition in late April, bringing its total size to 4,800 men. Ultimately more than 10,000 men—virtually every available unit of the Regular Army and additional National Guard troops—were committed to the expedition either in Mexico or its supporting units at Columbus.

Because of disputes with the Carranza administration over the use of the Mexico North Western Railway to supply Pershing's troops, the United States Army employed trucks to convoy supplies to the encampment where the Signal Corps also set up wireless telegraph service from the border to Pershing's headquarters. This was the first use of truck convoys in a U.S. military operation and provided useful experience for World War I. During this phase of the campaign Pershing maintained a small mobile headquarters of 30 men using a Dodge touring car for personal transportation, to keep abreast of the moving columns and control their movements, employing aircraft of the 1st Aero Squadron as messengers. His headquarters advanced as far as the 1st Aero Squadron's field at Satevó, southeast of Chihuahua City, before falling back at the end of April.

Villa had a six-day head start on the pursuit, all but ensuring that his forces would successfully break up into smaller bands and he would be able to hide in the trackless mountains. Nevertheless, he was nearly caught by the forced marches of the pursuing cavalry columns when he recklessly paused in his retreat to attack a Carrancista garrison. The Battle of Guerrero was fought on March 29, 1916, after a 55-mile night march through the snowy Sierra Madre by Colonel George A. Dodd and 370 men of the 7th Cavalry. 360 Villistas had remained in Guerrero celebrating the victory won over the Carrancista garrison and 160 more were in the next valley in nearby San Ysidro.

Dodd's force was unexpected by the Villistas, who hastily dispersed when the U.S. troops appeared on the steep eastern bluffs overlooking the town. Dodd immediately attacked, sending one squadron west around the town to block escape routes and advancing with the other. A planned charge was thwarted when the fatigued horses were unable to attain the proper gait. During a five-hour pursuit of fleeing Villista elements, over 75 of Villa's men were killed or wounded and he was forced to retreat into the mountains. Only five of the Americans were hurt, none of them fatally. The battle is considered the single most successful engagement of the expedition and possibly the closest Pershing's men came to capturing Villa.

After advancing from Namiquipa on March 24 to San Diego del Monte, the 10th Cavalry became isolated from Pershing's headquarters by a fierce snow storm on March 31. A squadron of the 10th marched toward Guerrero after receiving reports of the action there and at midday April 1 a meeting engagement resulted with one of the retreating Villista groups, 150 strong, under Francisco Beltran at a ranch near Agua Caliente. Breaking up into even smaller groups and retreating over a wooded ridge, some of the Villistas attempted to defend themselves behind a stone wall, resulting in what was purported to be the first mounted cavalry charge by U.S. troops since 1898, led by Major Charles Young. The pursuit lasted until darkness and the Buffalo Soldiers killed at least two Villistas left on the field and routed the remainder, without loss. The action also was the first time the U.S. Army used plunging fire by machine guns to support an attack.

The columns pushed deeper into Mexico, increasing tensions between the United States and the Carranza government. On April 12, 1916, Major Frank Tompkins and Troops K and M,  13th Cavalry, numbering 128 men, were attacked by an estimated 500 Mexican troops as they were leaving the town of Parral, 513 miles into Mexico and almost to the state of Durango, following violent protests by the civilian populace. Tompkins had been personally ordered to avoid a straight-up engagement with de facto government troops to prevent war between the countries and so used a rear guard to keep the Carrancistas at a distance during a retreat to his starting point, the fortified village of Santa Cruz de Villegas. Two Americans were killed in the skirmishing, one was missing from the rear guard, and another six were wounded, while the Carrancistas lost between fourteen and seventy men, according to conflicting accounts.

The battle marked a turning point in the campaign. Military opposition by Carranza forced a halt in further pursuit while diplomatic conversations took place by both nations to avoid war. Only four days earlier, on April 8, Army Chief of Staff General Hugh L. Scott had expressed to Secretary of War Baker that Pershing had virtually accomplished his mission and that it was "not dignified for the United States to be hunting one man in a foreign country". Baker concurred and so advised Wilson, but following the fight at Parral the administration refused to withdraw the expedition, not wanting to be seen as caving in to Mexican pressure during an election year. Instead, on April 21 Pershing ordered the four columns that had converged near Parral to withdraw to San Antonio de Los Arenales. A week later he assigned the cavalry regiments, including the newly arrived 5th Cavalry, to five districts created in central Chihuahua in which to patrol and seek out the smaller bands.

While executing the withdrawal order, Dodd and a portion of the 7th Cavalry fought an engagement on April 22 with about 200 Villistas under Candelaro Cervantes at the small village of Tomochic. As the Americans entered the village, the Mexicans opened fire from the surrounding hills. Dodd first sent patrols out to engage the Villistas' rear guard, to the east of Tomochic, and after these were "scattered", located the main body on a plain to the north and brought it into action. Skirmishing continued, but after dark the Villistas retreated and the Americans moved into Tomochic. The 7th Cavalry lost two men killed and four wounded, while Dodd reported his men had killed at least thirty Villistas.

Patrol district actions

The five districts that Pershing established west of the Mexican Central Railway on April 29, 1916, were:
 Namiquipa District (10th Cavalry) south of the 30th parallel to Namiquipa;
 Bustillos District (13th Cavalry), below the eastern part of Namiquipa District around Laguna Bustillos to San Antonio de Los Arenales and Chihuahua City;
 Guerrero District (7th Cavalry), below the western part of Namiquipa District and west of the Bustillos and San Borja Districts;
 San Borja District (11th Cavalry), south of Bustillos District between the Guerrero and Satevó Districts to Parral; and
 Satevó District (5th Cavalry), southeast of the Bustillos District and east of the San Borja District, south to Jimenez.

The next significant engagement took place on May 5. A small Carrancista garrison at the silver mining town of Cusihuiriachic was attacked by Villa's forces on May 4, prompting the garrison commander to request help from U.S. forces at nearby San Antonio. Six troops of the 11th Cavalry, its machine gun platoon, and a detachment of Apache Scouts under 1st Lt.  James A. Shannon, totaling 14 officers and 319 men, began a night march under Major Robert L. Howze. Arriving at Cusihuirischic, Howze found that 140 Villistas under Julio Acosta had pulled back into the mountains to the west to a ranch at Ojos Azules, and that the garrison commander had received orders not to cooperate with the Americans. Howze was delayed three hours in finding a guide and by the time he located the ranch and was deploying to attack, day had broken. When Acosta's guards and Howze's advance guard exchanged fire, Howze with Troop A immediately ordered a charge with pistols through the hacienda. Unable to deploy on line, the charge was made in column of fours and closed with the fleeing elements of Villistas. The other troops deployed to either side of the hacienda attempting to block escape and were supported by plunging fire from the machine gun troop. Friedrich Katz called the action the "greatest victory that the Punitive Expedition would achieve." Without a single casualty, the Americans killed forty-four Villistas and wounded many more. The survivors, including Acosta, were dispersed.

Also on May 5, several hundred Mexican raiders, under a Villista officer, attacked the geographically isolated towns of Glenn Springs and Boquillas in the Big Bend region of Texas. At Glenn Springs the Mexicans overwhelmed a squad of just nine 14th Cavalry troopers guarding the town, set fire to it, then rode on to Boquillas where they killed a boy, looted the town and took two captives. Local commanders pursued the Mexicans 100 miles into the state of Coahuila to free the captives and regain the stolen property. On May 12, Major George T. Langhorne and two troops of the 8th Cavalry from Fort Bliss, Texas, reinforced by Colonel Frederick Sibley and Troops H and K of the 14th Cavalry from Fort Clark, rescued the captives at El Pino without a fight. Three days later a small detachment of cavalry encountered the raiders at Castillon, killing five of the Villistas and wounding two; the Americans had no casualties. The cavalry force returned to the United States May 21 after ten days in Mexico.

On May 14, 2nd Lt. George S. Patton raided the San Miguelito Ranch, near Rubio, Chihuahua. Patton, a Pershing aide and a future World War II general, was out looking to buy some corn from the Mexicans when he came across the ranch of Julio Cárdenas, an important leader in the Villista military organization. With fifteen men and three Dodge touring cars, Patton led America's first motorised military action, in which Cárdenas and two other men were shot dead. The young lieutenant then had the three Mexicans strapped to the hood of the cars and driven back to General Pershing's headquarters. Patton is said to have carved three notches into the twin Colt Peacemakers he carried, representing the men he claimed to have killed that day. General Pershing nicknamed him the "Bandito".

The Villistas launched an attack of their own on May 25. This time a small force of ten men from the 7th Cavalry were out looking for stray cattle and correcting maps when they were ambushed by twenty rebels just south of Cruces. One American corporal was killed and two other men were wounded, though they killed two of the "bandit leaders" and drove off the rest.

On June 2, Shannon and twenty Apache scouts fought a small skirmish with some of Candelaro Cervantes' men who had stolen a few horses from the 5th Cavalry. Shannon and the Apaches found the rebels' trail, which was a week old by then, and followed it for some time until finally catching up with the Mexicans near Las Varas Pass, about forty miles south of Namiquipa. Using the cover of darkness, Shannon and his scouts attacked the Villistas' hideout, killing one of them and wounding another without losses to themselves. The Villista who died was thought to be the leader as he carried a sword during the fight.

Another skirmish was fought on June 9, north of Pershing's headquarters and the city of Chihuahua. Twenty men from the 13th Cavalry encountered an equally small force of Villistas and chased them through Santa Clara Canyon. Three of the Mexicans were killed and the rest escaped. There were no American casualties.

End of active operations

On May 9, at a face-to-face meeting in El Paso, Texas, Carranza's Secretary of War and Navy, General Álvaro Obregón, threatened to send a massive force against the expedition's supply lines and forcibly drive it out of Mexico. Funston reacted by ordering Pershing to withdraw all his troops from San Antonio de Los Arenales to Colonia Dublán. Although the order was rescinded on the evening of May 11 when no evidence of Carrancista troop movements was found, the southernmost supply depots had been closed and materiel sent north that could not easily be turned around. Pershing was ordered to halt in place at Namiquipa, making tactical dispositions of his forces there and on El Valle to the north. The movements began a gradual withdrawal of the expedition to Dublán. On May 19 units of the 10th and 11th Cavalry returned to the base to guard the supply lines with Columbus and conduct reconnaissance in the absence of the temporarily grounded 1st Aero Squadron. As the threat of war with the de facto government increased, the northward movement continued. Pershing's headquarters left Namiquipa on June 21, setting up again in Dublán, after which the advanced supply depot at Namiquipa closed June 23. June 29 found the expedition concentrated on the main base and a forward camp at El Valle 60 miles to the south.

The last and most costly engagement of the Mexican Expedition was fought on June 21 when 3 officers and 87 men of Troops C and K of the 10th Cavalry, sent separately to scout Carrancista dispositions reported along the Mexican Central Railway, combined into a single column and encountered a blocking force of 300 soldiers. They were soundly defeated at the Battle of Carrizal, with Captain Charles T. Boyd, 1st Lt. Henry R. Adair, and ten enlisted men killed, ten wounded and another 24 (23 soldiers and 1 civilian guide) taken prisoner. The remainder, including the sole surviving officer, Capt. Lewis S. Morey, were rescued four days later by a relief squadron of the 11th Cavalry. The Mexicans did not do much better; they reported the loss of 24 men killed and 43 wounded, including their commander, General Félix Uresti Gómez, while Pershing listed 42 Carrancistas killed and 51 wounded. When General Pershing learned of the battle he was furious and asked for permission to attack the Carrancista garrison of Chihuahua City. President Wilson refused, knowing that it would certainly start a war.

The action at Parral in April had made the destruction of Villa and his troops secondary to the objective of preventing further attacks on U.S. forces by Carrancistas. The battle at Carrizal brought the countries to the brink of war and forced both governments to make immediate overt gestures clearly showing their intent to avoid it. Although the United States deployed 100,000 troops on the border, by July 4 the major crisis had passed. The Punitive Expedition, U.S. Army remained at Colonia Dublán indefinitely as a fixed-base operation to be a negative incentive to the Carranza government to take seriously its obligation to catch Villa. The Carranza government proved unequal to the task but nevertheless U.S. operations inside Mexico virtually ceased over the next six months.

A Joint High Commission for negotiations with the Carranza government was agreed upon in July, and the first of 52 sessions met on September 6 in New London, Connecticut. Although the commission reached accord on all issues, the negotiations failed to result in a formal agreement for withdrawal of U.S. forces signed by the Mexican government. Despite this, Pershing was ordered on January 18, 1917 to prepare the expedition for return to the United States, which was executed between January 28 and February 5. While the expedition made a dozen successful contacts with Villista groups in the first two months of the campaign, killing many of his important subordinates and 169 of his men, all of whom had participated in the attack on Columbus, it failed in its other major objective of capturing Villa. However, between the date of the American withdrawal and Villa's retirement in 1920, Villa's troops did not again successfully raid the United States.

National Guard call-ups
Between June 1915 and June 1916 raiders from Mexican irregulars carried out 38 raids on U.S., resulting in the deaths of 26 soldiers and 11 civilians. Following the attack on Glenn Springs, the Army transferred three regiments of active duty soldiers to the border area. On May 8, state militia units from Texas, Arizona, and New Mexico were activated. On June 15, 1916, another attempted raid by Mexican border-crossers, this at San Ygnacio, Texas, 30 miles downstream from Laredo, was repulsed by soldiers with casualties to both sides. As a result, using powers granted by passage of the National Defense Act of 1916, Wilson on June 18 fully mobilized Guard units from the remainder of the states and the District of Columbia for duty on the border.  More than 140,000 National Guard troops were called up, but only two regiments, the 1st New Mexico Infantry and the 2nd Massachusetts Infantry, were actually assigned to the Mexican Expedition, and those to guard the base at Columbus. Historian Clarence C. Clendenen asserts that although no Guard units officially crossed into Mexico at any time, soldiers from the two regiments at Columbus did enter Mexico to perform various tasks.

Wide differences in proficiency existed between various guard units in training, leadership and equipment, so that for the most part units came to the border with only basic drilling as experience. Units were initially assigned as static guards for railroad bridges and border crossing points, but as training made them more proficient, they were assigned an increasing responsibility for the patrolling the border that resulted in encounters with smugglers and bandits who still posed an occasional threat. Records of the Utah National Guard indicate that it participated in three skirmishes after it arrived at Camp Stephen J. Little on the Arizona border in July 1916. The final action of the three, occurring January 26, 1917, resulted in an all-day border skirmish between Utah cavalrymen and Mexicans in which the guardsmen were reinforced and ten Mexicans were killed or wounded. While incapable of conducting organized combat operations with other units, the border security mission proved a training environment for the officers and men of the National Guard, who were again inducted into federal service after the United States entered World War I in April 1917. Many National Guard leaders in both World Wars traced their first federal service to the Mexican Expedition. In their history of the call-up, Charles Harris and Louis Sadler reveal its significance:

Between June 1916 and April 1917 the guard received intensive field training. Units from different states were sometimes grouped into large provisional units. Not only did the men become more proficient, but many officers gained invaluable experience commanding large formations. At the same time the guard was receiving badly needed equipment and supplies. The great call-up transformed the national guard into a much more effective fighting force, for it was as close as the United States came to the large-scale military maneuvers in which European armies traditionally engaged.

Aftermath
After U.S. forces were withdrawn in January 1917, Pershing publicly claimed the expedition to be a success, which in light of the public declarations by President Wilson was clearly not the case since Villa eluded capture by the U.S. Army. Pershing complained privately to his family that Wilson had imposed too many restrictions, which made it impossible for him to fulfill that portion of his mission. In the sting of the moment, having been compelled to withdraw out of political considerations and before much larger events in Europe put the episode behind him, he wrote that "Having dashed into Mexico with the intention of eating the Mexicans raw, we turned back at the first repulse and are now sneaking home under cover, like a whipped curr with its tail between its legs," referring to the massive rules of political restrictions put on him by President Wilson. Villa, however, gloated about Pershing's failure of capturing him with his characteristic harshness "That Pershing, came in like an eagle, and leaves now like a wet chicken".  During the three months of active operations, American forces killed or captured 292 Villistas and captured 605 rifles, 5 pistols, 14 machine guns, and 139 horses and mules from the Villistas. Most of the horses and mules were returned to local residents and the pistols kept as souvenirs. 

Pershing was permitted to bring into New Mexico 527 Chinese refugees who had assisted him during the expedition, despite the ban on Chinese immigration at that time under the Chinese Exclusion Act. The Chinese refugees, known as "Pershing's Chinese", were allowed to remain in the U.S. if they worked under the supervision of the military as cooks and servants on bases. In 1921, Congress passed Public Resolution 29, which allowed them to remain in the country permanently under the conditions of the 1892 Geary Act. Most of them settled in San Antonio, Texas.

Soldiers who took part in the Villa campaign were awarded the Mexican Service Medal.

Legacy
The chase after Villa was a small military episode, but it had important long-term implications. It enabled Carranza to mobilize popular anger, strengthen his political position, and permanently escalate anti-American sentiment in Mexico. On the American side, it made Pershing a national figure and, when Funston died of a heart attack shortly after the expedition returned to the United States, an obvious choice to lead the American forces in France in 1917. It gave the inexperienced American army some needed experience in dealing with training, logistics, and command using national guardsmen in a foreign land. It gave the American public a way to work out its frustrations over the European stalemate and it showed that the United States was willing to defend its borders while keeping that demonstration on a small scale.

Order of battle
United States Army:

 5th Cavalry Regiment
 7th Cavalry Regiment
 10th Cavalry Regiment (Buffalo Soldiers)
 11th Cavalry Regiment
 13th Cavalry Regiment
 6th Infantry Regiment
 16th Infantry Regiment
 17th Infantry Regiment
 24th Infantry Regiment (Buffalo Soldiers)
 4th Field Artillery Regiment
 6th Field Artillery Regiment
 1st Aero Squadron
 Apache Scouts
 2nd Massachusetts Infantry
1st Battalion, Field Artillery, Michigan National Guard

See also

References

Footnotes

Citations

Further reading
 
 
 Clendenon, Clarence C. (1969). Blood on the Border: The United States Army and the Mexican Irregulars. NY: Macmillan, 
 de Quesada, Alejandro (2012). The Hunt for Pancho Villa: The Columbus Raid and Pershing's Punitive Expedition 1916–17, Osprey Publishing, 
 Dubach Jr, Thomas Reese. "Reinforcements on the Border: The Utah National Guard's Role in the Punitive Expedition, 1916-1917." (MA Thesis, Utah State University, 2012). online; Bibliography pages 44–48.
  W.W. Norton, 
 Finley, James P., director and editor (1993). "Buffalo Soldiers at Huachuca: Military Events in the American Southwest from 1910–1916", Huachuca Illustrated: A Magazine of the Fort Huachuca Museum Volume 1.
 Garrigues, George. Liberty Bonds and Bayonets, (City Desk Publishing, 2020), Chapter 5, "On the Border." 
 Hall, Linda B. and Don M. Coerver. Revolution on the Border: The United States and Mexico 1910–1920 (University of New Mexico Press, 1988).
 Harris, Charles H. and Sadler, Louis R. (2015). The Great Call-Up: The Guard, the Border, and the Mexican Revolution. University of Oklahoma Press. 
 Hurst, James W. (2007). Pancho Villa and Black Jack Pershing: The Punitive Expedition in Mexico, Praeger. 
  in JSTOR 
 Katz, Friedrich (1981). The Secret War in Mexico: Europe, the United States, and the Mexican Revolution University of Chicago Press, 
 
 McLynn, Frank. Villa and Zapata: A History of the Mexican Revolution (New York: Carroll & Graf Publishers, 2000).
 Pershing, John J. (1916). "Report of operations of Punitive Expedition to June 30, 1916", October 10, 1916; Primary source
 
 Roberts, Richard C. "The Utah National Guard on the Mexican Border in 1916", Utah Historical Quarterly, Vol. 46 No. 3 (Summer 1978)
—(2003), Legacy, History of the Utah National Guard, Salt Lake City: National Guard Association of Utah, 
  Stenberg, Richard K., "Dakota Doughboys in the Desert: The Experiences of a North Dakota National Guard Company during the Mexican Border Campaign of 1916–1917," North Dakota History 71, nos. 1 & 2 (2004): 50–64.
 Stout, Joseph A., Jr. Border Conflict: Villistas, Carrancistas, and the Punitive Expedition, 1915–1920 (Fort Worth: Texas Christian University Press, 1999).
 Urban, Andrew. "Asylum in the Midst of Chinese Exclusion: Pershing's Punitive Expedition and the Columbus Refugees from Mexico, 1916–1921," Journal of Policy History Vol 23 (2011): 204–229.  
 Tompkins, Col. Frank (1934, 1996). Chasing Villa: The Last Campaign of the U.S. Cavalry, High-Lonesome Books: Silver City, New Mexico. 
 Urwin, Gregory J. W. (1983). The United States Cavalry: An Illustrated History, 1776–1944. University of Oklahoma Press, 
 White, E. Bruce and Francisco Villa, "The Muddied Waters of Columbus, New Mexico," The Americas Vol 32 No 1 (July 1975), pp. 72–98, Academy of American Franciscan History. in JSTOR  
 Williams, Vernon L. Lieutenant Patton and the American Army in the Mexican Punitive Expedition, 1915–1916. Dubuque, Iowa: Kendall/Hunt Pub. Co, 1992. 
 Yockelson, Mitchell (1997). "The United States Armed Forces and the Mexican Punitive Expedition: Part 1", Prologue Magazine, Fall 1997, Vol. 29, No. 3
—"The United States Armed Forces and the Mexican Punitive Expedition: Part 2", Prologue Magazine, Winter 1997, Vol. 29, No. 4

External links

 U.S. Army Heritage and Education Center: Mexican Border Service Photograph Collection
 Punitive Expedition in Mexico, 1916–1917: U.S. Department of State Archive

Mexican Revolution
Mexico–United States relations
20th-century military history of the United States
Punitive expeditions of the United States
1916 in Mexico
1917 in Mexico
1916 in the United States
1917 in the United States
Conflicts in 1916
Conflicts in 1917
History of Mexico
Campaigns of American wars
Invasions of Mexico